George Arthur Elliott  (born 1945) is a Canadian mathematician specializing in operator algebras, K-theory, and non-commutative geometry. He is a professor at the University of Toronto Department of Mathematics, and holds a Canada Research Chair. He is best known for his work on classifying C*-algebras, both for initiating their classification  and highlighting the importance of K-theory in this respect.

He was an invited speaker at the International Congress of Mathematicians, Zurich–1994.

Awards and honours

 1982 Elected as Fellow of Royal Society of Canada.
 1996 CRM/Fields Institute Prize
 1996-1998 Killam Research Fellow.
 1998 Jeffery–Williams Prize.
 1999 John L. Synge Award.
 2012 Fellow of the American Mathematical Society.
 2019 Fellow of the Canadian Mathematical Society

References

External links

Living people
1945 births
Canadian mathematicians
Academic staff of the University of Toronto
Fellows of the Royal Society of Canada
Canada Research Chairs
Fellows of the American Mathematical Society
Fellows of the Canadian Mathematical Society